Lichtenburg may refer to:

Lichtenburg, North West, a major town in the North West Province of South Africa
Lichtenburg concentration camp, a Nazi concentration camp in eastern Germany
Lichtenburg, a fictional grand duchy in the Balkans, in the 1940 film The Son of Monte Cristo
Lichtenburg, a song about a fictional place in Irving Berlin's play Call Me Madam

See also
Lichtenberg